Yuriy Naumkin (born 5 November 1968) is a retired Russian long jumper.

He finished eighth at the 1996 European Indoor Championships and tenth at the 1996 Olympic Games. At the Atlanta games he jumped a personal long jump best of 8.21m

References

1968 births
Living people
Place of birth missing (living people)
Russian male long jumpers
Olympic male long jumpers
Olympic athletes of Russia
Athletes (track and field) at the 1996 Summer Olympics
Russian Athletics Championships winners
20th-century Russian people
21st-century Russian people